Until Your Heart Stops is the debut album by metalcore band Cave In. It was released in 1999 on Hydra Head Records. Until Your Heart Stops has been regarded as a landmark release in the metallic hardcore genre.

Background
Despite being the band's second full-length release, Until Your Heart Stops represents the first time Cave In went into a studio to record a full album together. The album also marks the first time they would play as a four-piece, as it was recorded in the midst of a major line-up change, going through two vocalists and one bassist.

The actual writing of the album took place during the recording sessions of Cave In's previous release, compilation Beyond Hypothermia, which was a collection of Cave In's older songs, which they re-tracked, and in some cases, re-recorded.

Musical style
Until Your Heart Stops has primarily been described as a metalcore album. The album also features influences from other musical genres such as emo, noise rock and space rock.

Deluxe edition
On February 17, 2023, Cave In announced a deluxe edition reissue of Until Your Heart Stops. This edition will feature a remastered version of the album along with previously unreleased demos and alternative takes. The deluxe edition is set to be released on March 31, 2023 through Relapse Records.

Track listings

 "Controlled Mayhem Then Erupts" features a hidden track of noise after an unlisted segue track.

 "Controlled Mayhem Then Erupts" does not contain the hidden noise track on this version.

LP edition

 "Informing the Octopus" and "Casio Killtoy" are LP exclusive bonus tracks.
 "Until Your Heart Stops" still contains "Segue 2", however it is unlisted.
 "Bottom Feeder" still contains what is listed as "Segue 3" on the CD, but is also unlisted.
 The unlisted segue track on the CD after "Controlled Mayhem Then Erupts" is labelled as "Segue 3" on the vinyl version. However, it does not feature the hidden noise track afterward.

2023 deluxe edition

Personnel
Cave In
Stephen Brodsky – vocals, guitar, keyboards
Adam McGrath – guitar, vocals
Caleb Scofield – bass
J.R. Connors – drums, keyboards

Additional
Kurt Ballou (Converge) – guitar, percussion, vocals, engineer, producer
Jacob Bannon (Converge) – vocals, design, artwork
Jay Randall (Agoraphobic Nosebleed) – vocals
Travis Shettel (Piebald) – vocals
Dave Merullo – mastering
Dave Gatinella – concept
Grail Mortillaro – photography

References

1999 albums
Cave In albums
Hydra Head Records albums
Albums produced by Kurt Ballou
Albums with cover art by Jacob Bannon